Deh-e Arjomand (also Romanized as Deh-e Arjamand and Deh-e Arjmānd; also known as Arjmand and Arjomand) is a village in Azizabad Rural District, in the Central District of Narmashir County, Kerman Province, Iran. At the 2006 census, its population was 677, in 158 families.

References 

Populated places in Narmashir County